Vila Pouca de Aguiar is a municipality in the district of Vila Real in northern Portugal. Its population in 2011 was 13,187, in an area of 437.07 km². It has about 3,456 residents.

History 

There are various theories on the munipality's origins. Some historians believe it was the successor to the ancient city of Cauca, governed by Emperor Theodosius I; however, it is uncertain why or when its name would have been changed from Cauca to Pouca. Another theory is that "Vila Pouca" referred to a small agrarian community, and that "Aguiar" referred to an ancient administrative region, to disambiguate it from other communities named Vila Pouca. Although the name means "Vila Pouca of Aguiar", "aguiar" is derived from aquila ("where the eagles are").

In the 13th century, the municipality was part of the land of Aguiar. In the 12 and 13th centuries, Aguiar consisted of seven ecclesiastical parishes, including São Salvador de Jugal, which corresponded to the actual parish of Vila Pouca de Aguiar. The Inquirições (inquiries/inventory) of King Afonso II established that the parochia of São Salvador de Jugal was composed of these localities and towns: Condado (three couples); Calvos (one couple); Guilhado (four couples) and Nuzedo (20 couples), in addition to the towns of Fraengo and Outeiro. The document also identifies Jugal as an administrative unit, with elaborated administrative domain over the territory of Aguiar, and where the parochial church was located, but no reference to Jugal as a town.

There is no historical explanation for the name-change from São Salvador de Jugal to Vila Pouca, nor when it occurred, although it was sometime in the 14th century.

In the early 20th century, the area's leading figure was Martiniano José Ferreira Botelho, a doctor, druggist, and politician known for his humanitarian character and his advocacy of the local medicinal waters for treatments. He and his family donated land to the community for the current market square, municipal slaughterhouse and well.

Geography
Integrated into the Alto Tâmega subregion, the municipality of Vila Pouca de Aguiar is situated in the north of the district of Vila Real, between the mountains of Serra do Alvão and Serra da Padrela, extending over a territory of approximately 437 km². It is located within a strategic connection, not just between other Portuguese municipalities in the interior but also, as a transit point to the coastal areas (across the A7 and A24 motorways). Within a long fertile valley, and surrounded by high pasture-lands, it is defensively safe within the Transmontana escarpments. The region is covered in national monuments and historical structures: the Castle of Aguiar da Pena, the millenarian Roman mining complex of Tresminas, the thermals of Pedras Salgadas, several leisure centres (such as the Falperra Dam/Reservoir), the Dolmens of Alvão, churches, graves/funeral sites, medieval bridges, sun-dials and castro dot the landscape of this unassuming region.
It is located in a narrow valley 25 kilometers north of the district capital, Vila Real, and is connected to the same by national N2 highway.

In 2006 the A7 toll road to Guimarães was completed and the last stretch of the A24, connecting Vila Pouca with Vila Real was opened in June 2007. This non-toll four-lane highway links Coimbra with the Spanish border in Vila Verde. One of the longest and highest highway bridges in Europe was built just south of Vila Pouca, carrying traffic across the fertile valley.

Administratively, the municipality is divided into 14 civil parishes (freguesias):

 Alfarela de Jales
 Alvão
 Bornes de Aguiar
 Bragado
 Capeludos
 Pensalvos e Parada de Monteiros
 Sabroso de Aguiar
 Soutelo de Aguiar
 Telões
 Tresminas
 Valoura
 Vila Pouca de Aguiar
 Vreia de Bornes
 Vreia de Jales

Vila Pouca de Aguiar has for many years experienced the desertification of the Portuguese interior. Population densities have historically identified a strong concentration of people in the municipal seat, or its peripheral parishes. From 1981 to 1991, the parishes of Bragado, Pensalves, Afonsim, Vreia de Jales, Vreia de Bornes, Valoura and Soutelo de Aguiar have registered flawing population growth rates. The parish of Sabroso de Aguiar did not exist in 1981, but by 1991 it registered the highest population concentration in the region. Comparatively, between 1991 and 2001, there were no changes in population densities in many of the parishes. The municipal seat and Sabroso de Aguiar continue to show a growth in population density.

Climate

Twin towns – Sister cities 

Vila Pouca de Aguiar is twinned with:
  Fabero del Bierzo, El Bierzo, Province of León, Spain

Economy
Part of region characterized by fertile soils, and the typical climate of the Terra Fria Transmontana, the municipality of Vila Pouca de Aguiar is essentially subsistence agricultural, cultivating cereal crops, potato, vegetables and supporting some vineyards. The small valleys support cattle which graze in the open pasturelands. The lands of the Alvão valley benefited from the construction of the Alvão Dam/Reservoir, which allowed irrigation of these lands since the mid-20th century.

In addition, the economy supports small service industries, government-based dominated tertiary employment, the granite extraction industry (concentrated in the mines of Jales) and the mineral waters in Pedras Salgadas, a small spa town located about ten kilometers north on the main highway to Chaves.

Architecture

Prehistoric
 Dolmen of Serra do Alvão, a funerary complex of dolmens and menhirs in the civil parish of Soutelo de Aguiar;

Military
 Castle of Pena de Aguiar, Romanesque castle composed of rock, with three distinct spaces, barbican tower and acropolis, surrounded by a line of walls forming a circular enclosure with low plan, in the civil parish of Telões;

Notable citizens
 Manuel Gregório de Sousa Pereira de Sampaio (1766-1844) a Portuguese military leader and noble; Miguelist general.
 Martiniano José Ferreira Botelho (ca.1853 – ca.1939), a doctor, druggist, politician and humanitarian, known for his local service to the community and his treatise on the medicinal use of the waters of the area. His home is a point of reference in the community, known as the Casa do Condado.
 Rui Sampaio (born 1987) a Portuguese defensive midfield footballer with about 250 club caps.

References
Notes

Sources
 

Towns in Portugal
Municipalities of Vila Real District